Rugby in Argentina may refer to:

 Rugby league in Argentina
 Rugby union in Argentina